Luca M. Cumani (born 7 April 1949, in Milan, Italy) is an Italian thoroughbred horse trainer and breeder. He trained at Bedford House Stables in Newmarket from 1976 to 2019. He has trained a multitude of high-profile horses, including seven Classic race winners, two Epsom Derby winners in Kahyasi (1988) and High-Rise (1998), as well as a Breeders' Cup Mile winner in Barathea (1994).

Early life and family

As the son of champion amateur jockey Elena and champion trainer Sergio Cumani, horseracing has always been in his blood.  He followed in their footsteps, emulating first his mother and then his father. 

Cumani is the father of Francesca Cumani who is the co-presenter of ITV's racing coverage in the UK.

Career

Realising that Newmarket is the centre of the racing world, Luca moved to England in his early twenties to work for ten-time champion trainer Henry Cecil. 
 
It was not long before he started up his own training establishment at Bedford House. Within ten years he had 12 Group 1 winners in five countries and the tally has now risen to 55 until the present day.  Not content with claiming the majority of the big domestic races, he has ventured far and wide with globetrotting champions such as Falbrav and Alkaased to win Group 1 races in Hong Kong and Japan, respectively.

Cumani has also earned a reputation as a mentor to jockeys and assistant trainers. Frankie Dettori, Jimmy Fortune, Jason Weaver, Royston Ffrench and Nicky Mackay are all previous Champion Apprentices who learnt their trade under his tutelage. Leading rider Kieren Fallon was formerly employed by Cumani, as was rider Kirsty Milczarek. Christophe Clement, James Toller, Jonathan Portman, Chris Wall, John Berry, David Simcock and Marco Botti are the best known current trainers that spent a portion of their formative years as assistant trainer to Cumani.

Since 1984 Cumani and his wife Sara have owned and managed the Fittocks Stud at Upend, producing many good horses including Milan, Magical Romance, Chicquita and Alexandrova.

In October 2018 Cumani announced that he would retire from training at the end of the year.

Major wins
 Great Britain
 Champion Stakes - (1) - Legal Case (1989)
 Cheveley Park Stakes - (1) - Embla (1985)
 Derby - (2) - Kahyasi (1988), High-Rise (1998)
 Eclipse Stakes - (1) - Falbrav (2003)
 Fillies' Mile - (3) - Shamshir (1990), Glorosia (1997), Gossamer (2001)
 International Stakes - (3) - Commanche Run (1985), One So Wonderful (1998), Falbrav (2003)
 King George VI and Queen Elizabeth Stakes - (1) - Postponed (2015)
 Lockinge Stakes - (1) - Then Again (1987)
 Nassau Stakes - (1) - Free Guest (1985)
 Queen Anne Stakes - (3) - Then Again (1987), Markofdistinction (1990), Barathea (1994)
 Queen Elizabeth II Stakes - (3) - Markofdistinction (1990), Falbrav (2003), Starcraft (2005)
 St. James's Palace Stakes - (2) - Bairn (1985), Half a Year (1987)
 St. Leger - (1) - Commanche Run (1984)
 Sun Chariot Stakes - (6) - Free Guest (1984, 1985), Infamy (1987), Red Slippers (1992), One So Wonderful (1997), Kissogram (1998)
 Sussex Stakes - (1) - Second Set (1991)
 Yorkshire Oaks - (2) - Only Royale (1993, 1994)

 Canada
 Canadian International Stakes - (1) - Infamy (1988)
 E. P. Taylor Stakes - (2) - Sudden Love (1988), Zomaradah (1998)

 Dubai
 Dubai Duty Free - (1) - Presvis (2011)

 France
 Grand Prix de Saint-Cloud - (1) - Alkaased (2005)
 Prix d'Ispahan - (1) - Falbrav (2003)
 Prix du Moulin de Longchamp - (1) - Starcraft (2005)
 Prix Royal-Oak - (1) - Old Country (1983)

 Germany
 Grosser Preis von Berlin - (1) - Second Step (2015)

 Hong Kong
 Hong Kong Cup - (1) - Falbrav (2003)
 Queen Elizabeth II Cup - (1) - Presvis (2009)

 Ireland
 Irish 1,000 Guineas - (2) - Ensconse (1989), Gossamer (2002)
 Irish 2,000 Guineas - (1) - Barathea (1993)
 Irish Champion Stakes - (1) - Commanche Run (1985)
 Irish Derby - (1) - Kahyasi (1988)

 Italy
 Derby Italiano - (1) - Old Country (1982)
 Gran Premio d'Italia - (3) - Masad (1992), Jaunty Jack (1997), Clapham Common (1998)
 Gran Premio di Milano - (1) - Endless Hall (2000)
 Oaks d'Italia - (2) - Zomaradah (1998), Contredanse (2010)
 Premio Lydia Tesio - (3) - Papering (1997), Zomaradah (1999), God Given (2018)
 Premio Roma - (2) - Old Country (1985), Legal Case (1990)

 Japan
 Japan Cup - (1) - Alkaased (2005)

 Singapore
 Singapore Airlines International Cup - (1) - Endless Hall (2001)

 United States
 Arlington Million - (1) - Tolomeo (1983)
 Breeders' Cup Mile - (1) - Barathea (1994)

External links
Website 
Biography at the National Thoroughbred Racing Association website.

References

Italian horse trainers
British racehorse trainers
1949 births
Sportspeople from Milan
Living people